Stanley "Stan"/ "Mac" McCormick (5 July 1923 – July 1999) was an English professional rugby league footballer who played in the 1940s and 1950s, and coached in the 1960s and 1970s. McCormick is a St Helens R.F.C. Hall of Fame inductee.

Background
Stan McCormick was born in Oldham, Lancashire, England, and he died aged 75–76.

Playing career

International honours
Stan McCormick won caps for England while at Belle Vue Rangers in 1948 against Wales, and France, while at St. Helens in 1949 against Wales, and France, in 1951 against Wales, in 1953 against France (2 matches), and Wales, and won caps for Great Britain while at Belle Vue Rangers in 1948 against Australia (2 matches); and while at St. Helens in 1949 against Australia.

Stan McCormick also represented Great Britain while at St. Helens between 1952 and 1956 against France (1 non-Test matches).

Championship final appearances
Stan McCormick played in Warrington's 8-7 victory over Halifax the Championship Final during the 1953–54 season at Maine Road, Manchester on Saturday 8 May 1954, in front of a crowd of 36,519.

County League appearances
Stan McCormick played in St. Helens' victory in the Lancashire League during the 1952–53 season, and played in Warrington's victories in the Lancashire League during the 1953–54 season and 1954–55 season.

Challenge Cup Final appearances
McCormick played  in St. Helens' 10–15 defeat by Huddersfield in the 1953 Challenge Cup Final during the 1952–53 season at Wembley Stadium, London on Saturday 25 April 1953, played  in Warrington's 4–4 draw with Halifax in the 1954 Challenge Cup Final during the 1953–54 season at Wembley Stadium, London on Saturday 24 April 1954, in front of a crowd of 81,841, and played  in the 8-4 victory over Halifax in the 1954 Challenge Cup Final replay during the 1953–54 season at Odsal Stadium, Bradford on Wednesday 5 May 1954, in front of a record crowd of 102,575 or more.

County Cup Final appearances
McCormick played left-, i.e. number 4, in Belle Vue Rangers' 7-10 defeat by Wigan in the 1947 Lancashire County Cup Final during the 1947–48 season at Station Road, Swinton on Saturday 1 November 1947, played , i.e. number 5, in St. Helens' 5-22 defeat by Leigh in the 1952 Lancashire County Cup Final during the 1952–53 season at Station Road, Swinton on Saturday 29 November 1952, and played  in the 16-8 victory over Wigan in the 1953 Lancashire County Cup Final during the 1953–54 season at Station Road, Swinton on Saturday 24 October 1953.

Club career
In January 1949, McCormick joined St. Helens from Belle Vue Rangers for a record fee of £4,000 (based on increases in average earnings, this would be approximately £329,600 in 2014), he later went on to play for Warrington.

References

External links
Profile at saints.org.uk

1923 births
1999 deaths
Broughton Rangers players
England national rugby league team players
English rugby league coaches
English rugby league players
Great Britain national rugby league team players
Huddersfield Giants players
Lancashire rugby league team players
Oldham R.L.F.C. players
Rugby league players from Oldham
Place of death missing
Rugby league wingers
Salford Red Devils coaches
St Helens R.F.C. players
St Helens R.F.C. coaches
Warrington Wolves players